This list of members of the 77th West Virginia House of Delegates lists the members of the House of Delegates for the 77th West Virginia Legislature.

House of Delegates Leadership 
Speaker of the House
Robert S. Kiss (D), Raleigh Co., 27th District
Speaker Pro Tempore
John Pino (D), Fayette Co., 29th District
Majority Leader
W. Richard Staton (D), Wyoming Co., 22nd District
Minority Leader
Charles S. Trump, IV (R), Morgan Co., 51st District
Majority Whip
Scott Varner (D), Marshall Co., 4th District
Minority Whip
Larry Border (R), Wood Co., 9th District

Alphabetical List of Members in the House of Delegates 
Jon Amores (D-30th District)
William Anderson (R-8th District)
Sam J. Argento (D-35th District)
Tim Armstead (R-32nd District)
Bob Ashley (R-11th District)
Tom Azinger (R-10th District)
Larry W. Barker (D-18th District)
Robert D. Beach (D-44th District)
J.D. Beane (D-10th District)
Craig P. Blair (R-52nd District)
Brent Boggs (D-34th District)
Larry Border (R-9th District)
Bonnie Brown (D-30th District)
Richard Browning (D-22nd District)
Greg A Butcher (D-19th District)
Thomas A. Campbell (D-28th District)
Samuel J. Cann, Sr. (D-41st District)
Ray Canterbury (R-28th District)
Mike Caputo (D-43rd District)
Mitch Carmichael (R-12th District)
Kevin J. Craig (D-15th District)
Gerald L. Crosier (D-26th District)
Joe DeLong (D-1st District)
John Doyle (D-57th District)
Walter E. Duke (R-54th District)
Jeff Eldridge (D-19th District)
John N. Ellem (R-10th District)
Timothy R. Ennis (D-2nd District)
Allen V. Evans (R-48th District)
Joe C. Ferrell (D-19th District)
Ron Fragale (D-41st District)
Eustace Frederick (D-24th District)
Cindy Frich (R-44th District)
Mike Hall (R-14th District)
Bill Hamilton (R-39th District)
William G. Hartman (D-37th District)
Barbara Hatfield (D-30th District)
Nancy Houston (D-44th District)
Greg Howard (R-16th District)
Lidella Wilson Hrutkay (D-19th District)
Mark Hunt (D-30th District)
Richard J. Iaquinta (D-41st District)
'Robert S. Kiss (D-27th District)
K. Steven Kominar (D-20th District)
Patrick Lane (R-32nd District)
Margarette R. Leach (D-15th District)
Otis A. Leggett (R-7th District)
Marshall Long (D-25th District)
Linda Longstreth (D-43rd District)
Tom Louisos (D-29th District)
Virginia Mahan (D-27th District)
Tim Manchin (D-43rd District)
Charlene Marshall (D-44th District)
Dale Martin (D-13th District)
Harold Michael (D-47th District)
Tim Miley (D-41st District)
Cliff Moore (D-23rd District)
Jim Morgan (D-15th District)
John Overington (R-55th District)
Corey L. Palumbo (D-30th District)
Brady Paxton (D-13th District)
Don Perdue (D-17th District)
David G. Perry (D-29th District)
David Pethtel (D-5th District)
John Pino (D-29th District)
Mary M. Poling (D-40th District)
Thomas Mike Porter (R-25th District)
Bill Proudfoot (D-37th District)
Victor A. Roberts, Jr. (R-53rd District)
William R. Romine (R-6th District)
Ruth Rowan (R-50th District)
Robert A. Schadler (R-49th District)
Pattie Eagloski Schoen (R-14th District)
Kelli Sobonya (R-16th District)
Sharon Spencer (D-30th District)
Douglas Stalnaker (D-38th District)
W. Richard Staton (D-22nd District)
William Stemple (D-33rd District)
Dale Stephens (D-16th District)
Debbie Stevens (R-46th District)
Linda Sumner (R-27th District)
Sally Susman (D-27th District)
Randy Swartzmiller (D-1st District)
Robert C. Tabb (D-56th District)
Joe Talbott (D-36th District)
Jeffery L. Tansill (R-42nd District)
Richard Thompson (D-17th District)
Ron Thompson (D-27th District)
Charles S. Trump, IV (R-51st District)
Kenneth Tucker (D-4th District)
Scott Varner (D-4th District)
Christopher Wakim (R-3rd District)
Ron Walters (R-32nd District)
Carrie Webster (D-31st District)
Danny Wells (D-30th District)
Harry Keith White (D-21st District)
L. Gil White (R-3rd District)
Larry A. Williams (D-45th District)
Locke Wysong (D-58th District)
Jack Yost (D-2nd District)

List of Members in the House of Delegates by District 
1st District
Joe DeLong (D-Hancock Co.)
Randy Swartzmiller (D-Hancock Co.)
2nd District
Jack Yost (D-Brooke Co.)
Timothy R. Ennis (D-Brooke Co.)
3rd District
L. Gil White (R-Ohio Co.)
Christopher Wakim (R-Ohio Co.)
4th District
Scott G. Varner (D-Marshall Co.)
Kenneth G. Tucker (D-Marshall Co.)
5th District
Dave Pethtel (D-Wetzel Co.)
6th District
Roger Romine (R-Tyler Co.)
7th District
Otis A. Leggett (R-Pleasants Co.)
8th District
E.W. Bill Anderson (R-Wood Co.)
9th District
Larry Border (R-Wood Co.)
10th District
John Ellern (R-Wood Co.)
J.D. Beane (D-Wood Co.)
Tom Azinger (R-Wood Co.)
11th District
Bob Ashley (R-Roane Co.)
12th District
Mitch Carmichael (R-Jackson Co.)
13th District
Dale Martin (D-Putnam Co.)
Brady Paxton (D-Putnam Co.)
14th District
Mike Hall (R-Putnam Co.)
Patti Eagloski Schoen (R-Putnam Co.)
15th District
Kevin J. Craig (D-Cabell Co.)
James H. Morgan (D-Cabell Co.)
Margarette Leach (D-Cabell Co.)
16th District
Kelli Sobonya (R-Cabell Co.)
Dale Stephens (D-Cabell Co.)
Greg Howard (R-Cabell Co.)
17th District
Richard Thompson (D-Cabell Co.)
Don Perdue (D-Wayne Co.)
18th District
Larry Barker (D-Boone Co.)
19th District
Lidella Wilson Hrutkay (D-Logan Co.)
Joe Ferrell (D-Logan Co.)
Greg Butcher (D-Logan Co.)
Jeff Eldridge (D-Logan Co.)
20th District
K. Steven Kominar (D-Mingo Co.)
21st District
Harry Keith White (D-Mingo Co.)
22nd District
Richard W. Staton (D-Wyoming Co.)
Richard Browning (D-Wyoming Co.)
23rd District
Cliff Moore (D-McDowell Co.)
24th District
Eustace Frederick (D-Mercer Co.)
25th District
Marshall Long (D-Mercer Co.)
Thomas Porter (R-Mercer Co.)
26th District
Gerald Crosier (D-Monroe Co.)
27th District
Ron M. Thompson (D-Raleigh Co.)
Linda Sumner (R-Raleigh Co.)
Virginia Mahan (D-Summers Co.)
Sally Matz Susman (D-Raleigh Co.)
Robert S. Kiss (D-Raleigh Co.)
28th District
Ray Canterbury (R-Greenbrier Co.)
Thomas W. Campbell (D-Greenbrier Co.)
29th District
David G. Perry (D-Fayette Co.)
John Pino (D-Fayette Co.)
Tom Louisos (D-Fayette Co.)
30th District
Sharon Spencer (D-Kanawha Co.)
Mark Hunt (D-Kanawha Co.)
Barbara Hatfield (D-Kanawha Co.)
Bonnie Brown (D-Kanawha Co.)
Corey L. Palumbo (D-Kanawha Co.)
Jon Amores (D-Kanawha Co.)
Danny Wells (D-Kanawha Co.)
31st District
Carrie Webster (D-Kanawha Co.)
32nd District
Ron Walters (R-Kanawha Co.)
Patrick Lane (R-Kanawha Co.)
Tim Armstead (R-Kanawha Co.)
33rd District
William F. Stemple (D-Calhoun Co.)
34th District
Brent Boggs (D-Braxton Co.)
35th District
Sam Argento (D-Nicholas Co.)
36th District
Joe Talbott (D-Webster Co.)
37th District
William G. Hartman (D-Randolph Co.)
Bill Proudfoot (D-Randolph Co.)
38th District
Douglas K. Stalnaker (D-Lewis Co.)
39th District
Bill Hamilton (R-Upshur Co.)
40th District
Mary M. Poling (D-Barbour Co.)
41st District
Tim Miley (D-Harrison Co.)
Richard J. Iaquinta (D-Harrison Co.)
Ron Fragale (D-Harrison Co.)
Samuel J. Cann (D-Harrison Co.)
42nd District
Jeffery Tansill (R-Taylor Co.)
43rd District
Tim Manchin (D-Marion Co.)
Linda Longstreth (D-Marion Co.)
Mike Caputo (D-Marion Co.)
44th District
Robert D. Beach (D-Monongalia Co.)
Nancy Houston (D-Monongalia Co.)
Cindy Frich (R-Monongalia Co.)
Charlene Marshall (D-Monongalia Co.)
45th District
Larry A. Williams (D-Preston Co.)
46th District
Debbie Stevens (R-Tucker Co.)
47th District
Harold Michael (D-Hardy Co.)
48th District
Allen Evans (R-Grant Co.)
49th District
Robert A. Schadler (R-Mineral Co.)
50th District
Ruth Rowan (R-Hampshire Co.)
51st District
Charles S. Trump, IV (R-Morgan Co.)
52nd District
Craig P. Blair (R-Berkeley Co.)
53rd District
Victor A. Roberts (R-Berkeley Co.)
54th District
Walter E. Duke (R-Berkeley Co.)
55th District
John Overington (R-Berkeley Co.)
56th District
Robert C. Tabb (D-Jefferson Co.)
57th District
John Doyle (D-Jefferson Co.)
58th District
Locke Wysong (D-Jefferson Co.)

List of Members in the House of Delegates by County of Residence 
Barbour County
Mary M. Poling (D-40th District)
Berkeley County
Craig P. Blair (R-52nd District)
Victor A. Roberts (R-53rd District)
Walter E. Duke (R-54th District)
John Overington (R-55th District)
Boone County
Larry W. Barker (D-18th District)
Braxton County
Brent Boggs (D-34th District)
Brooke County
Timothy R. Ennis (D-2nd District)
Jack Yost (D-2nd District)
Cabell County
Kevin J. Craig (D-15th District)
Margarette Leach (D-15th District)
Jim Morgan (D-15th District)
Greg Howard (R-16th District)
Kelly Sobonya (R-16th District)
Dale Stephens (D-16th District)
Richard Thompson (D-17th District)
Calhoun County
William Stemple (D-33rd District)
Clay County
none
Doddridge County
none
Fayette County
Tom Louisos (D-29th District)
David G. Perry (D-29th District)
John Pino (D-29th District)
Gilmer County
none
Grant County
Allen Evans (R-48th District)
Greenbrier County
Thomas W. Campbell (D-28th District)
Ray Canterbury (R-28th District)
Hampshire County
Ruth Rowan (R-50th District)
Hancock County
Joe DeLong (D-1st District)
Randy Swartzmiller (D-1st District)
Hardy County
Harold Michael (D-47th District)
Harrison County 
Samuel J. Cann, Sr. (D-41st District)
Ron Fragale (D-41st District)
Richard J. Iaquinta (D-41st District)
Tim Miley (D-41st District)
Jackson County
Mitch Carmichael (R-12th District)
Jefferson County
Robert C. Tabb (D-56th District)
John Doyle (D-57th District)
Locke Wysong (D-58th District)
Kanawha County
John Amores (D-30th District)
Bonnie Brown (D-30th District)
Barbara Hatfield (D-30th District)
Mark Hunt (D-30th District)
Corey L. Palumbo (D-30th District)
Sharon Spencer (D-30th District)
Danny Wells (D-30th District)
Carrie Webster (D-31st District)
Tim Armstead (R-32nd District)
Patrick Lane (R-32nd District)
Ron Walters (R-32nd District)
Lewis County
Douglas K. Stalnaker (D-38th District)
Lincoln County
none
Logan County
Greg A. Butcher (D-19th District)
Jeff Eldridge (D-19th District)
Joe C. Ferrell (D-19th District)
Lidella Wilson Hrutkay (D-19th District)
Marion County
Mike Caputo (D-43rd District)
Linda Longstreth (D-43rd District)
Tim Manchin (D-43rd District)
Marshall County
Kenneth Tucker (D-4th District)
Scott Varner (D-4th District)
Mason County
none
Mercer County
Eustace Frederick (D-24th District)
Marshall Long (D-25th District)
Thomas Mike Porter (R-25th District)
Mineral County
Robert A. Schadler (R-49th District)
Mingo County
K. Steven Kominar (D-20th District)
Harry Keith White (D-21st District)
Monongalia County
Robert D. Beach (D-44th District)
Cindy Frich (R-44th District)
Nancy Houston (D-44th District)
Charlene Marshall (D-44th District)
Monroe County
Gerald L. Crosier (D-26th District)
Morgan County
Charles S. Trump, IV (R-51st District)
McDowell County
Cliff Moore (D-23rd District)
Nicholas County
Sam Argento (D-35th District)
Ohio County
Christopher Wakim (R-3rd District)
L. Gil White (R-3rd District)
Pendleton County
none
Pleasants County
Otis A. Leggett (R-7th District)
Pocahontas County
none
Preston County
Larry A. Williams (D-45th District)
Putnam County
Dale Martin (D-13th District)
Brady Paxton (D-13th District)
Mike Hall (R-14th District)
Patti Eagloski Schoen (R-14th District)
Raleigh County
Robert S. Kiss (D-27th District)
Linda Sumner (D-27th District)
Sally Susman (D-27th District)
Randolph County
William G. Hartman (D-37th District)
Bill Proudfoot (D-37th District)
Ritchie County
none
Roane County
Bob Ashley (R-11th District)
Summers County
Virginia Mahan (D-27th District)
Taylor County
Jeffery Tansill (R-42nd District)
Tucker County
Debbie Stevens (R-46th District)
Tyler County
Roger Romine (R-6th District)
Upshur County
Bill Hamilton (R-39th District)
Wayne County
Don Perdue (D-17th District)
Webster County
Joe Talbott (D-36th District)
Wetzel County
Dave Pethtel (D-5th District)
Wirt County
none
Wood County
E. William Anderson (R-8th District)
Larry Border (R-9th District)
Tom Azinger (R-10th District)
J.D. Beane (D-10th District)
John N. Ellem (R-10th District)
Wyoming County
Richard Browning (D-22nd District)
W. Richard Staton (D-22nd District)

See also 
West Virginia House of Delegates
List of members of the 78th West Virginia House of Delegates

External links 
West Virginia Legislature Homepage
WV House of Delegates District Map

M
77
77